The Great Britain women's national field hockey team represents Great Britain in international field hockey tournaments such as the Summer Olympics.

In most other competitions, including the Women's Hockey World Cup, the Commonwealth Games and some editions of the Hockey Champions Trophy, the three home nations compete in their own right: England and Scotland and Wales.

The team has won gold once and bronze twice at the Summer Olympics, and silver once in the 
Champions Trophy.

Tournament history

Summer Olympics
1988 – 4th place
1992 – 
1996 – 4th place
2000 – 8th place
2008 – 6th place
2012 – 
2016 – 
2020 –

World League
 2014–15 – 7th place

Pro League
2019 – 8th place
2020–21 – 
2022–23 – Qualified

Champions Trophy
1987 – 5th place
1989 – 4th place
1993 – 6th place
1997 – 5th place
2012 – 
2016 – 5th place
2018 – 5th place

Players

Current squad
The following 34 players have been selected by Great Britain Hockey for their 2022 Training Squad. 

Caps and goals (for both England and Great Britain) updated as of 19 February 2022, after match v Argentina.

Fixtures and results

2021 Fixtures and results

2020–21 Women's FIH Pro League

2020 Summer Olympics

2020 Fixtures and results

2020–21 Women's FIH Pro League

2019 Fixtures and results

2019 Women's FIH Pro League

Japan Test Matches

India Test Matches

FIH Olympic Qualifiers

2018 Fixtures and results

Argentina Test Series

See also
Great Britain men's national field hockey team
England women's national hockey team
Ireland women's national field hockey team
Scotland women's national field hockey team
Wales women's national field hockey team

References

External links
Official website
FIH profile

Sport in Berkshire
Royal Borough of Windsor and Maidenhead
Nationla team
European women's national field hockey teams
Field Hockey